A Todo Romantic Style is the fourth album by Panamian singer-songwriter Flex. It was released on March 29, 2011 through EMI Latin and Big Moon Records. This album contains 10 songs which were released on the album Romantic Style Parte 3: Desde La Esencia and five international hits previously released their first two albums.

Track list

References

External links
Official website

2011 albums
Flex (singer) albums
Spanish-language albums